José Mazuelos Pérez (Born Seville 9 October 1960). is a Spanish prelate of the Catholic Church, currently bishop of the diocese of Canarias (part of the Canary Islands) and previously he served as bishop of the diocese of Asidonia-Jerez.

Biography

After completing medical studies in 1983, he worked as a doctor in Osuna at the San Carlos de San Fernando Military Hospital in Cadiz.
In 1985 he began his ecclesiastical studies at the Seminary of Seville. He was ordained a priest on 17 March 1990.
He studied in Rome obtaining a degree (1995) and a doctorate (1998) in Moral Theology at the Pontifical Lateran University.

On 19 March 2009, he was appointed bishop of Asidonia-Jerez de la Frontera by Pope Benedict XVI and was consecrated on 6 June 2009 in the cathedral of Jerez de la Frontera by Cardinal Carlos Amigo Vallejo.

On 6 July 2020, he was appointed bishop of the Canary Islands diocese of Canarias (which includes the islands of Gran Canaria, Lanzarote and Fuertaventura) he took possession of the see on 2 October 2020.

See also
 Diocese of Canarias
 Diocese of Tenerife (the remaining Canary Islands)

References

Spanish Roman Catholic bishops
Bishops appointed by Pope Benedict XVI
1960 births
Living people